Promi Big Brother is a German television reality show based on the Dutch show Big Brother, created by producer John de Mol in 1997, which is airing from 2013. The show followed a number of celebrity contestants, known as Promis (lit. Celebrities), who were isolated from the outside world for an extended period of time in a custom-built Set. In Season 1-7, after the second week, every day, one of the housemates was evicted by a public vote, with the last housemate, named the winner. For the first time, season 8 of Promi Big Brother aired for three weeks.

Promi Big Brother began as a spin-off series to the original Big Brother Germany, and premiered on Sat.1 on 13 September 2013.

Comedian Cindy aus Marzahn and television presenter and Comedian Oliver Pocher hosted the first season. Jochen Schropp hosted season two onward. Season five was hosted by Jochen Schropp and Jochen Bendel and from season six onward the show is hosting by Jochen Schropp and Marlene Lufen.

Format 

Promi Big Brother follows in his conception the basic idea of Big Brother. For a given period of time, several people live in a television studio set up as a living environment, the so-called "container". The daily routine is structured by the production company, which appears as the computer voice "Big Brother". Competitions are held or assignments are given to the participants of the show.

The lives of the participants, who are referred to as "celebrities" in the program and in the title, are recorded around the clock by television cameras and microphones and broadcast live in the form of live broadcasts or as a compilation.

Prize money 
The winner of Promi Big Brother receives a cash prize for being the last remaining housemate.

 In Promi Big Brother 1, the winner didn't receive a cash prize.
 From Promi Big Brother 2, the winner receives €100,000.

Distribution of participants 

Since the second season, the participants are divided into two different areas: In addition to a luxurious area, there is an area in which the participants live in poor conditions. The distribution of the participants can be changed by spectator ratings, arbitrary stage directions or since the third season also due to the outcome of duels.

In seasons 2 to 4 attention was paid to an even distribution of the participants (per area six people). Since the fifth season, there is often an uneven distribution. For example, on the second day of the sixth season, three participants lived in the luxurious area, while the other nine participants had to live in the poor area.

Since the fifth season, both areas are on one level. In the previous three seasons, there were two levels.

In season 10, participants were divided into three areas.

Nomination and voting 
Since the second season, participants have nominated one other participant each day from the second live show to leave the house or show. Afterward, the audience selects by televoting a participant from the nomination list, which should remain in the house or in the show. The one who has received the least audience votes must leave. If a housemate voluntarily leaves the house (or for other reasons), the eviction will expire on the appropriate number of days. After two weeks, there will be the finale at the end of the season, in which four of the last five remaining participants fall out. The last one remaining is the winner of the season.

In the first season, the one who got the most audience votes had to leave.

Theme 
Some seasons include a theme.

Series details and viewership

Broadcasting

The finals are broadcast on Fridays at 8:15pm except the Season 10 Finale. This aired because of the ongoing Fifa World Cup Qatar 2022 on a Wednesday Evening at 8.15 p.m

Spin-off shows

Live stream
During the first season, there was a live stream during commercial breaks and a 2-hour live stream on Sky Deutschland after the show broadcast on Sat.1. From the second season, a 24-hour live stream from various providers (Season 2: Maxdome, Season 3: Sky Deutschland, Season 4: Bild) was offered. Since the fifth season, no live stream is available.

Web shows
During the first season, the web show was hosted by Etienne Gardé and Nils Bomhoff, and during the second season by Cindy aus Marzahn and Ingo Wohlfeil. For the third and fourth seasons, the web show was hosted by Aaron Troschke alone. The web show during the fifth season was again hosted by Aaron Troschke, but this time with Melissa Khalaj. From the sixth season, Troschke hosted again the web show alone.

Since the seventh season Raffaela "Raffa" Zollo presents the IGTV coverage from the Promi Big Brother Instagram account.

During the sixth season, for the first time, a four-part reality documentary titled Promi Big Brother – Der Tag danach (The day after) is available online.

Companion shows
During the first season, a weekly evening magazine show titled Promi Big Brother Inside was aired on Sat.1.

Since the second season, a live late-night show with the name Promi Big Brother – Die Late Night Show was airing daily on sixx, until the seventh season, and since the eighth season is airing on Sat.1, throughout the season, hosted by Jochen Bendel and Melissa Khalaj. During the fifth season, the show temporarily stopped because Bendel switched to host the main show.

After the third season, a special episode titled Promi Big Brother – Jetzt wird abgerechnet was aired on Sat.1.

Presenters

Intros

See also
List of Promi Big Brother housemates

References

External links
 

 
Sat.1 original programming
Television shows set in Germany
2013 German television series debuts
2020s German television series
Television series by Endemol
German-language television shows
German reality television series